Krauklis is a Latvian language surname from the Latvian word for raven. Notable people with the name include:
 Alfrēds Krauklis (1911–1991), former Latvian basketball player and coach
 Vents Armands Krauklis (1964), Latvian politician and musician

References 

Latvian-language masculine surnames
Surnames from nicknames